Richard Berkeley may refer to:
 Richard Berkeley (died 1604) (1531–1604), Member of Parliament for Gloucestershire, 1604
 Richard Berkeley (died 1661) (1579–1661), Member of Parliament for Gloucestershire, 1614
 Richard Berkeley (Sussex MP) (by 1465–1513 or later), MP for Winchelsea and Rye

See also
 Richard Berkley (disambiguation)